In Iraq, lesbian, gay, bisexual, transgender (LGBT) individuals are subject to widespread discrimination. Openly gay men are not permitted to serve in the military and same sex marriage or civil unions are illegal. LGBT people do not have any legal protections against discrimination and are frequently victims of vigilante justice and honor killings.

LGBT history in Iraq and the legality of same-sex sexual activity

Ancient Mesopotamia
The Šumma ālu, an Akkadian tablet, includes this code, where it regards male homosexuality in a positive light:

If a man copulates with his equal from the rear, he becomes the leader among his peers and brothers.

In the ancient Assyrian society, the Almanac of Incantations featured prayers praising the equality of love between heterosexual and gay male couples. A man had the rights to visit any gay prostitute or sleep with another man, just as long as false rumors or rape were not involved. Nevertheless, a man taking the submissive role was perceived negatively in ancient Mesopotamia.

A particular Middle Assyrian Law Code from Assur, dating from 1,075 BC, condemns homosexual rape or forced sex. It speaks of a "seignior" (high social figure in the community) and his "neighbor" (someone of equal social status):

If a seignior [an Assyrian man] lay with his neighbor [another citizen], when they have prosecuted him (and) convicted him [the first citizen], they shall lie with him (and) turn him into a eunuch.

Kingdom of Iraq under British administration
Iraq was given a ban on homosexuality, defined in the penal code as sodomy, while under British rule.

Kingdom of Iraq
The ban was initially maintained when Iraq achieved its Independence in 1932.

Iraqi Republic
The Criminal Code of 1969, enacted by the Ba'athist party, only criminalized sexual behavior in cases of adultery, incest, rape, prostitution, public acts or cases involving fraud or someone unable to give consent due to age or mental defect. Homosexuality per se was not a crime, but could be justification for government discrimination and harassment under laws designed to protect national security and public morality.

In addition to the Criminal Code, the Ba'athist regime would issue additional resolutions on specific topics. Sodomy was re-criminalized by a 1988 resolution, but only when it involved prostitution. [Combating Prostitution Law No. 8 of 1988].

In the early 1990s, at the United Nations, the Iraqi delegation cited religion at the time as their reasoning for opposing efforts to have the international body support for LGBT rights, challenging the widely held view of Saddam as a secularist.

In 2001, the IRCC Resolution 234 of 2001 was enacted that established the death penalty for adultery, being involved with prostitution, and anyone who, "Commits the crime of sodomy with a male or female or who violates the honor of a male or female without his or her consent and under the threat of arm or by force in a way that the life of the victim (male or female) is threatened."

Approximately 3,000 people were tortured from 1991 to 2003 by Saddam Hussein's security forces for expressing their sexuality.

With the intention of discrediting Saddam Hussein with his supporters, the CIA considered making a video in which he would be seen having sex with a teenage boy.

Coalition Provisional Authority
When Coalition Provisional Authority Chief executive Paul Bremer took control of Iraq following the U.S. invasion in 2003, he issued a series of decrees that restored the Iraqi criminal code back to the Iraq penal code of 1968 (as revised in 1988).

While not actually illegal, waves of harassment and violence against LGBT people came from family members and other Iraqis who felt the need to punish people for violating traditional Islamic laws.

Republic of Iraq

On February 5, 2005, the IRIN issued a report titled "Iraq: Male homosexuality still a taboo". The article stated, among other things, that "honor killings" by Iraqis against a gay family member are common and given some legal protection. The article also stated that the 2001 amendment to the criminal code stipulating the death penalty for homosexuality "has not been changed", even though Paul Bremer clearly ordered the criminal code to go back to its 1980s edition.

Since 2005, there have been reports that the Supreme Council for the Islamic Revolution in Iraq's Badr Organization has been involved in death squad campaigns against LGBT Iraqi citizens, and that they are supported in these policies by the Grand Ayatollah Ali al-Sistani. New barbaric attacks, with 90 victims, are reported in the first months of 2012.

These reports seem to stem from a fatwa issued by Iraqi cleric Grand Ayatollah Ali al-Sistani stating that homosexuality and lesbianism are both "forbidden" and that they should be "Punished, in fact, killed. The people involved should be killed in the worst, most severe way of killing".

Early drafts in English of the 2005 Iraqi constitution contained a provision that asserted that none of the rights or liberties protected in the Constitution would apply to "deviants". Later revisions of the Iraqi Constitution removed the deviants clause. Several clauses throughout the revised document assert that Islam will be the foundation of the law and that various civil liberties shall be limited by "public morality".

After the fall of the Ba'athist party in Iraq, the national penal code reverted to an earlier edition from 1988, with subsequent revisions.

Private, non-commercial, non-fraternal homosexual relations between consenting adults, who have reached the age of eighteen years, would appear to be legal. Likewise nothing is expressly said in the national penal code about cross-dressing, unless used for deception.

Yet, several provisions of the national penal code may impact the legal rights of LGBT people, given that prevailing cultural and religious mores view homosexuality and cross-dressing negatively. In addition to a ban on same-sex marriage, these public morality-based laws impose restrictions on the freedom of speech, press and personal expression.

Paragraph 215 – Any person who produces, imports, exports or obtains a picture, written material or sign with intent to trade, distribute, display or exhibit such material, which, by its nature, endangers the public security or brings the country into disrepute unless he was acting in good faith is punishable by detention plus a fine not exceeding 300 dinars or by one of those penalties.

Paragraph 220 – If five or more people are assembled in a public place, thereby endangering the public security and the public authorities order them to disperse, any person who is given that order and refuses to comply with it is punishable by a period of detention not exceeding 1 year plus a fine not exceeding 100 dinars or by one of those penalties.

Paragraph 376 – Any person who obtains a marriage certificate knowing it to be invalid for any reason in secular or canonical law and any person who issues such certificate knowing the marriage to be invalid is punishable by a term of imprisonment not exceeding 7 years or by detention. The penalty will be a term of imprisonment not exceeding 10 years if the spouse, in respect of whom the reason for the invalidity has arisen, conceals that fact from his partner or consummates the marriage on the basis of the invalid certificate.

Paragraph 401 – Any person who commits an immodest act in public is punishable by a period of detention not exceeding 6 months plus a fine not exceeding 50 dinars or by one of those penalties.

Paragraph 402 – (1) The following persons are punishable by a period of detention not exceeding 3 months plus a fine not exceeding 30 dinars or by one of those penalties:
(a) Any person who makes indecent advances to another man or woman.
(b) Any person who assails a woman in a public place in an immodest manner with words, actions or signs.

Paragraph 403 – Any person who produces, imports, publishes, possesses, obtains or translates a book, printed or other written material, drawing, picture, film, symbol or other thing that violates the public integrity or decency with intent to exploit or distribute such material is punishable by a period of detention not exceeding 2 years plus a fine not exceeding 200 dinars or by one of those penalties. The same penalty applies to any person who advertises such material or displays it in public or sells, hires or offers it for sale or hire even though it is not in public or to any person who distributes or submits it for distribution by any means. If the offense is committed with intent to deprave, it is considered to be an aggravating circumstances.

Paragraph 404 – Any person who himself or through some mechanical means sings or broadcasts in a public place obscene or indecent songs or statements is punishable by a period of detention not exceeding 1 year or by a fine not exceeding 100 dinars.

Paragraph 434 – Insult is the imputation to another of something dishonorable or disrespectful or the hurting of his feelings even though it does not include an imputation to him of a particular matter. Any person who insults another is punishable by a period of detention not exceeding 1 year plus a fine not exceeding 100 dinars or by one of those penalties. If such insult Is published in a newspaper or publication or medium it is considered an aggravating circumstance.

Paragraph 438 – The following persons are punishable by a period of detention not exceeding 1 year plus a fine not exceeding 100 dinars or by one of those penalties: (1) Any person who publishes in any way a picture, remark or information in respect of the private or family life of another, even though such information is true and such publication causes him offense. (2) Any person other than those mentioned in Paragraph 328 who is privy to information contained in a letter, telex or
telephone conversation and he discloses such information to a person other than for whom it is intended and such disclosure causes harm to another.

Police officers
In addition to the national penal code, members of the Iraqi Internal Security forces, along with current students and retirees, are bound the rules outlined in Decree Number 9 (2008). The degree bans police officers from associating with people of ill repute, and punishes police officers who engage in homosexual sodomy with up to fifteen years imprisonment.

Military 
The Military Penal Law No. 19 of 2007 prohibits its men from engaging in homosexual acts.

Personal status law 
These are laws used in special courts designed to handle certain disputes among Iraqi Muslims, especially as it applies to marriage, divorce, alimony, and inheritance.

The Iraqi Personal Status Law (1959) has to relevant provisions;

Article 3 – Marriage is defined as a union between a man and a woman to create children.

Article 40 Section 2 – A legal separation may be granted if either spouse is unfaithful, with the act of homosexuality included as an example of being unfaithful. This provision was added to the law in 1981.

The Iraqi Kurdistan Personal Status Law (1992) also has some relevant provisions;

Article 1 - Marriage is defined as a voluntary union between a man and a woman to create a family.

Article 7 - The couple seeking to marry must produce medical documents that prove that they are not infected with AIDS.

Post-2011 U.S. withdrawal
It has been suggested that physical and sexual violence against homosexuals has increased since the U.S. withdrawal from Iraq, with militias and the police in particular, despite the legal nature of homosexuality, now engaging more in anti-homosexual violence. This problem is made more complicated by the fact that members of the police are often also members of various militia groups.

The Iraqi Ministry of Human Rights has responded to allegations of increasing homophobic violence by stating that its responses are limited by the fact that LGBT people are not a listed minority in Iraq, but has also emphasized that a number of cases of discrimination and violence against the LGBT community has been passed onto the interior ministry. Ali al-Dabbagh, Prime Minister Maliki's spokesperson has denied organized persecution against the LGBT community but has suggested that members of the community keep their homosexuality private in order to avoid persecution.

Iraqi Kurdistan 
In 2010, efforts by the Kurdish government to promote gender equality, were attacked by Kamil Haji Ali, Minister of Endowments and Religious Affairs, as well as the Kurdistan Islamic Movement for trying to legalize same-sex marriage. The KRG and other supporters of gender equality, stated the legislation does not deal with LGBT rights issues, but deals with social justice issues impacting women.

ISIL terrorism

In the areas controlled by the Islamic State of Iraq and the Levant, first offenders of homosexuality are sentenced to death, torture, floggings, beatings, and other violence.

LGBT activism in Iraq

Rasan 
The first pro LGBT+ organization to formally and legally operate in Iraq is Rasan. The organization is operating in Sulaymaniyah, located in Iraqi Kurdistan. The organization was initially a feminist women's rights organization when it was established in 2004, but then started working for LGBT+ people in 2012 and implemented larger projects in 2016 as partners of COC Nederland in a project called "Pride Program" (called Crossing Iraqi Rainbow locally in Iraq).

The work began by a campaign which consisted of painting murals around the city of Sulaymaniyah, where the organization's base is located. Amongst the works done, a lot of the murals represented the LGBT+ community and had rainbows and other symbols that were associated with the community. Some of the murals consisted of same-sex couples with "love is love" messages written under them. Although there are other organization that are working for the LGBT+ community, Rasan is the only local organization publicly supporting the community in Iraq as a whole, with a focus on the Kurdish population.

IraQueer 

For decades, the LGBT community in Iraq has been one of the most invisible communities in the world facing all kinds of discrimination, with barely any activism or advocacy in favor of this group. But in the last couple of years an underground movement started which led to creating an organization for LGBTIQ+ individuals in Iraq with the name IraQueer.

IraQueer (Iraq Queer) aims at raising the awareness about and for the LGBTIQ+ community in Iraq and Kurdistan region through sharing news, and personal stories of queer individuals. A prominent Iraqi cleric has also broken the silence and condemned violence against the LGBT community.

The International Gay and Lesbian Human Rights Commission (IGLHRC) are a group of individuals who actively promote the rights of LGBTQ individuals in Iraq. The Islamic state prescribes death for the "practice" of homosexuality. Furthermore, evidence gathered for two briefings by IGLHRC, its partners, and MADRE demonstrate the direct effect of the collapse of the rule of law on LGBT persons, through unfettered violence by sectarian militias.

Yeksani 
Yeksani is an initiative focused on advocating for LGBT rights in the Kurdistan Region of Iraq. Founded by Zhiar Ali, a Kurdish LGBT rights activist and former media and communications officer at Rasan, the organization works to raise awareness of LGBT issues and advocate for legal protections and equality for the community. The organization has been active in the region since 2021, and has carried out various campaigns and initiatives to promote LGBT rights. According to their website, "Yeksani was created to combat the lengthy hate campaigns the LGBT+ community has been facing in Iraq, partly due to improper media representation."

International concerns 

The U.S. Department of State's 2012 human rights report found,
Due to social conventions and retribution against both victim and perpetrator of non-consensual same-sex sexual conduct and violence against participants in consensual same-sex sexual conduct, this activity was generally unreported. In light of the law[,] authorities relied on public indecency charges or confessions of monetary exchange (i.e., prostitution, which is illegal), to prosecute same-sex sexual activity. ... LGBT persons often faced abuse and violence from family and nongovernmental actors. From February to April, a wave of violent attacks in Baghdad, Basrah, Samarra, Wasit, and Tikrit targeted individuals perceived to be LGBT.... In early February[,] signs and flyers appeared in Baghdad that threatened persons by name unless they cut their hair, stopped wearing nonconformist clothing, and gave up their "alternative" lifestyles. This intimidation campaign precipitated attacks. Attacks ranged from intimidation and verbal harassment to reports of kidnappings, beatings (some of which resulted in deaths), sexual assault, and killings. Reports varied on the number of victims killed in the attacks, some of which reportedly were carried out by extremist groups, including the Mahdi Army and League of the Righteous (Asa’ib Ahl al-Haq). UNAMI independently verified the deaths of at least 12 individuals; a Reuters report put the number of victims in Baghdad at 14. Local human rights NGOs reported much higher numbers. ... The government did not acknowledge a pattern of attacks nor take measures to ensure safety for individuals publicly named. ... Due to stigma, intimidation, and potential harm, including violent attacks, LGBT organizations did not operate openly, nor were gay pride marches or gay rights advocacy events held. The law prohibits discrimination based on race, disability, or social status, but it does not address ... sexual orientation or gender identity. Societal discrimination in employment, occupation, and housing based on sexual orientation, gender identity, and unconventional appearance was common. Information was not available regarding discrimination in access to education or health care due to sexual orientation or gender identity, although media reported that students were harassed at school for not adopting conventional clothing or hairstyles. There were minimal government efforts to address this discrimination. At year's end[,] authorities had not announced any other arrests or prosecutions of any persons for violence against LGBT individuals, including cases reported in 2011.

In June 2009, the U.S. State Department raised concerns regarding equality and human rights in a statement from spokesperson Ian Kelly:
In general, we absolutely condemn acts of violence and human rights violations committed against individuals in Iraq because of their sexual orientation or gender identity. This is an issue that we've been following very closely since we have been made aware of these allegations, and we are aware of the allegations. Our training for Iraqi security forces includes instruction on the proper observance of human rights. Human rights training is also a very important part of our and other international donors' civilian capacity-building efforts in Iraq. And the US embassy in Baghdad has raised, and will continue to raise, the issue with senior officials from the government of Iraq, and has urged them to respond appropriately to all credible reports of violence against gay and lesbian Iraqis.

Summary table

See also 
 Human rights in post-invasion Iraq
 LGBT rights in Asia
 LGBT rights in the Middle East
 Violence against LGBT people

Notes

References